Hugh Alexander Fraser (October 26, 1958 – June 17, 2020) was a Canadian jazz musician known for his work as a pianist, trombonist and composer.

Early Life and Education 

Born in Victoria, British Columbia, Fraser studied with Dave Robbins in Vancouver, Slide Hampton in New York, and Kenny Wheeler in London. He also attended the Banff Centre for Arts and Creativity.

Career 
Fraser began teaching at the Banff Centre for Arts and Creativity in 1986 and was appointed head of the jazz program in 1991. He also held teaching appointments in jazz education at the Royal Academy of Music, the University of Ulster, University of Victoria, and the Victoria Conservatory of Music.

Early in his career, Fraser formed the Vancouver Ensemble of Jazz Improvisation (VEJI), a big band that went on to win the open class at the Canadian Stage Band Festival in 1981. The Hugh Fraser Quintet, a hard-bop band which drew members from VEJI, toured widely and appeared frequently at Canadian and International jazz festivals. Fraser performed with Jaki Byard, Clark Terry, Dizzy Gillespie, Maynard Ferguson, Billy Eckstine, and many other well known jazz musicians.

Personal life 
In 2017, Fraser was diagnosed with cancer, but continued to perform. He died on 17 June 2020 in Vancouver, British Columbia at the age of 62.

Awards
Looking Up - 1989 Juno Award for Best Jazz Album (winner)
Pas de Problem - 1990 Juno Award for Best Jazz Album (nominated)
In The Mean Time - 1998 Juno Award for Best Mainstream Jazz Album (winner)

Discography

Solo/The Hugh Fraser Quintet

Looking Up (1987)
Pas de Problemes (1988)
The Sensorium Suite (1992)
Trinity (1992)
Sensorium Two (1993)
Red and Blue (1995)
In the Meantime (1997)
Back to Back (1998)
Stardust Suite (2000)
A Night in Vancouver (2004)
Hugh Fraser's Bonehenge (2005)
Concerto (2012)

With VEJI

VEJI (1980)
Classic VEJI (1986)
VEJI Now! (1990)
V (1999)
Big Works (2002)

Compositions

Fraser composed over 200 jazz works. Over 100 of his compositions have been recorded.

References

External links
 Hugh Fraser Bio
 Hugh Fraser Discography
 
  as The Hugh Fraser Quintet
 Straight Interview

1958 births
2020 deaths
Canadian jazz pianists
Musicians from Victoria, British Columbia
Juno Award for Traditional Jazz Album of the Year winners
Canadian jazz trombonists
Canadian jazz composers
21st-century Canadian pianists
21st-century trombonists